Ludwig Andreas Khevenhüller, Graf von Aichelberg-Frankenburg (en: Louis Andrew Khevenhüller, Count of Aichelberg-Frankenburg) (30 November 1683 – 26 January 1744) was an Austrian field-marshal who came of a noble family that was originally from Franconia and had settled in Carinthia.

Career
He first saw active service under Prince Eugene of Savoy in the War of the Spanish Succession and by 1716 had been given command of Prince Eugene's own regiment of dragoons. He distinguished himself at the battles of Peterwardein (5 August 1716) and Belgrade (1717), and became in 1723 General-Feldwachtmeister (equivalent to major general), in 1726 Colonel-Proprietor a Dragoon regiment and in 1733 Feldmarschalleutnant (equivalent to lieutenant-general).

In 1734 the War of the Polish Succession brought him into the field again. He was present at the Battle of Parma (29 June 1734), where Count Mercy, the Austrian commander, was killed, and after Mercy's death he held the chief command of the army in Italy until the arrival of Field Marshal Königsegg under whom he again distinguished himself at the Battle of Guastalla (19 September 1734). He was once more in command during the operations which followed the battle, and his skillful generalship won for him the grade of General of Cavalry. He continued in military and diplomatic employment in Italy to the close of the war.

In 1737 Khevenhüller was made Field Marshal, Prince Eugene recommending him to his sovereign as the best general in the service. His chief exploit in the Turkish War, which soon followed his promotion, was at the Battle of Radojevatz (28 September 1737), where he cut his way through a greatly superior Turkish army. In 1738/9 Khevenhüller met severe budgetary restrictions with an elaborate army reduction scheme. This was successful, and led to his appointment as commander-in-chief of the Vienna garrison.

Khevenhüller surpassed himself in the War of the Austrian Succession. As commander-in-chief of the army on the Danube he not only drove out the French and Bavarian invaders of Austria in a few days of rapid marching and sharp engagements (January 1742), but overran southern Bavaria, captured Munich, and forced a large French corps in Linz to surrender. Later in the summer of 1742, owing to the inadequate forces at his disposal, he had to evacuate his conquests, but in the following campaign, though now subordinated to Prince Charles of Lorraine, Khevenhüller reconquered southern Bavaria, and in June forced the emperor to conclude the unfavourable Convention of Nieder-Schönfeld. He disapproved of the advance beyond the Rhine which followed these successes, and events showed that his fears were justified, for the Austrians had to fall back from the Rhine through Franconia and the Breisgau. Khevenhüller, however, conducted the retreat with admirable skill.

On his return to Vienna, Maria Theresa decorated the field marshal with the Order of the Golden Fleece. He died suddenly at Vienna on 26 January 1744.

Military instruction manual
Khevenhüller wrote various instructional works for officers and soldiers: (Des G. F. M. Grafen von Khevenhüller Observationspunkte für sein Dragoner-Regiment (1734 and 1748) and a règlement for the infantry (1737)), and  two important works on war in general, Kurzer Begriff aller militärischen Operationen (Vienna, 1756; French version, Maximes de guerre, Paris, 1771); and "Ideen vom Kriege," posthumously published in _Mittheilungen des k. und k. Kriegsarchiv_, Neue Folge 7--8 (1893—4): 286—441 and 319—97.

Notes

Ancestry

References
Constantin von Wurzbach: Biographisches Lexikon des Kaiserthums Oesterreich. Vienna 1856 - 1891.

1683 births
1744 deaths
Military personnel from Linz
Field marshals of Austria
German Roman Catholics
Austrian Roman Catholics
Counts of Austria
Austrian military personnel of the War of the Austrian Succession
Knights of the Golden Fleece of Austria